Atlantic Rhapsody is a 1989 Faroese documentary film by Katrin Ottarsdóttir. The original Faroese title is Atlantic Rhapsody - 52 myndir úr Tórshavn, where the second part means "52 pictures from Tórshavn". The film presents a day in the life of some inhabitants of Tórshavn, the capital of the Faroe Islands. The narrative is structured as a relay race, in which a person, a thing or something out of a scene brings the audience into another scene with new people and events. It is the first ever Faroese feature-length film.

Synopsis
A trip through 24 hours of the smallest capital in the world, Tórshavn, the film begins with a father and a daughter who are having breakfast when some fire trucks drive by. A woman and her child are looking at the fire and meet a married couple. The couple say hello to a man who is going out with his boat etc. Out of this emerges a kaleidoscopic story of both daily occurrences and dramatic situations, which in an entertaining and ironic way acts as a commentary on the Faroese, foreigners in the islands, as well as Faroese society in general.

Production
Atlantic Rhapsody is the first feature film ever to be produced in the Faroes. It is a no-budget film made against all odds for 1.7 million DKR.

Accolades
In 1989, the film received the prize of the Nordische Filminstitute at the film festival Nordische Filmtage in Lübeck.

External links
 Official website
 

1989 documentary films
1989 films
Danish documentary films
Faroese-language films
Faroese documentary films
Films directed by Katrin Ottarsdóttir